Peter George Kaye  is the CEO of the Duke of Edinburgh's International Award – Australia.

Prior to this role, he founded Consultgroup, an international corporate governance and HR consultancy and has been a director and Chair of a range of private companies and mutual organisations, including Community First Credit Union. Appointed CEO in 2012 after 33 years of volunteer work, undertaking a range of governance roles for the Award nationally and internationally.

Community 
Peter has been a director and chair of a variety of company and charity Boards including SIDS and Kids. Chair of SIDS and Kids (now called Red Nose Foundation) from 2006 to 2015 including driving several mergers paving the way to a national organisation  
From 1992, Peter has been an active microfinance volunteer having established credit unions and savings clubs in nine South Pacific countries. He was a recipient of the Father Ganey Award in Fiji. Peter's work in the Solomon Islands included establishing the Y-Fin project as well as assisting set up of Duke of Edinburgh's International Award Units.

Peter has a long history of volunteer work throughout the Pacific Islands, in particular supports credit union and micro finance initiatives in the Solomon Islands since 1993.

In Sydney, Peter is a Unit Commander for the NSW State Emergency Service, Ashfield-Leichhardt unit serving as a volunteer since 1976 and as Controller/Commander since 1983.

Studies 
Kaye was educated in Geelong and finished schooling at Ashfield Boys High in Sydney.  He graduated from Sydney University with Bachelor of Economics and later undertook studies at the University of Technology Sydney completing a Graduate Diploma in Adult Education.

Kaye has served on the Board of the South Pacific Economic Journal, Australian National University as well as being a tutor and guest lecturer in Change Management at the University of Technology, Sydney.

Honors 
 1992 National Service Medal, with 2 bars
 2005 SES Long Service Medal, with 3 bars (NSW Government)
 2013 Commissioner’s Commendation for Service (SES)
 2014 Kaye Member of the Order of Australia for his service to the community and youth 
 2014  Citizen of the Year for Ashfield NSW.
 2015 NSW SES Commissioner's Unit Citation
 2017 Gold Distinguished Service Medal, the Duke of Edinburgh's International Award - Australia
 2021 Emergency Services Medal

References

Living people
Australian businesspeople
Members of the Order of Australia
Year of birth missing (living people)